The Malayali is a tribal group found in the Eastern Ghats of northern Tamil Nadu. The name derives from malai-alam meaning "hill-place," denoting an inhabitant of the hills. They are the largest Scheduled Tribe in Tamil Nadu, with a population of around 358,000. They are divided in to three groups: the Periya Malayalis ("big" Malayalis) who live in the Shevaroys, the Nadu Malayalis ("middle" Malayalis) from the Pachaimalais, and the Chinna Malayalis ("small" Malayalis) from the Kollaimalais.

Edgar Thurston believed they were once Tamils from the plains who moved up into the hills and developed their own culture.

Each group of Malayalis have their own tales about their origins. According to their traditions, the three groups were descendants of three brothers from Kanchipuram who settled at each of the three hill ranges. One story is this: A long time ago the Vedars (hunting community) of Kagundi, having been refused marriage with Vellalar girls, kidnapped them. To recover them, seven Vellalar men set out with dogs, telling their wives that if their dogs returned alone, they should assume they had perished. At the Palar river, the men were able to cross but the dogs returned home. After the men successfully rescued the girls, they returned home to find themselves presumed dead and their wives now considered widows. Therefore they married Vedar women and moved into the hills.

The Malayalis are mainly hill farmers, who cultivate thinai and samai (types of millet). Each village is headed by a headman, who has an extra share of goods from the festivals. Under the headman was the kangani, who did duties for the headman and received some grain in return. They have a system of stratification. The Gounder is the headman of the village and has the highest status. The moopan is an intermediary between the Gounder and the kudippadai, the common people. These divisions are only present in social and religious rites.

The Malayalis have several types of marriage: arranged marriage (known as sellakalyanam), marriage by elopement (less common) are some. During the nitchayadhartham, the engagement, a group of 10 men, including the groom's father (if alive) goes to the bride's house. The group must wear dhotis and thalaipagai (a turban) such that no hair on the head is seen. Although its original reasoning is unknown, some believe it wards off evil omens. The party is given mats to sit on, and are served water by the girl in order to observe her bearing and manners. If they need more time to observe, they ask for more water. They are then invited to stay for dinner: if the match is not OK, the invitation is decline, but if the match is approved, the invitation is accepted. To fix the bride price, or parisam in Tamill, the bride and groom's party meet on an auspicious day, without bad omens being present, and are offered milk (or starch water). Then follows a symbolic conversation about the quality of the milk, which ends with the groom proposing the bride price. This is then negotiated again twice, which is the final bride price. The bridegroom's family is obligated to give the largest parisam they can afford. The day of the marriage is fixed at the same time.

They worship Siva and Vishnu, but mainly worship village goddesses also found in the lowlands such as Mariamman and Draupadiamman. They commonly took oaths holding camphor in front of the god and then extinguish it, symbolizing their desire for the deity to "snuff out" their life if they have told a lie.

References 

Tribes
Tamil Nadu
Eastern Ghats
Adivasi
Scheduled Tribes of Tamil Nadu